Songyos Sugmakanan (born 20 August 1973), nicknamed Yong, is a Thai film director and producer, best known for film and television work done with the studio GTH/GDH 559, and as CEO of its subsidiary Nadao Bangkok.

Songyos graduated from Chulalongkorn University's Faculty of Communication Arts, and made his directorial debut as one of the six directors of the 2003 hit Fan Chan, which led to the formation of GTH. He continued to produce other works with the studio, focusing on youth dramas, including Dorm (2006), Hormones (2008), and The Billionaire (2011). In 2013, he spearheaded GTH's branching into television through the creation of Hormones: The Series, which became immensely popular and initiated a wave of Thai teen dramas. He serves as CEO of the GTH/GDH 559 talent management agency Nadao Bangkok.

Filmography 
 My Elephant (Dore Dek Chore Chang) (2002) - short film
 Fan Chan (My Girl) (2003) - co-directed
 Dorm (Dek Hor) (2006)
 Hormones (Pidtermyai Huajai Wawoon) (2008)
 The Billionaire (2011)
Coffie Prince (2012) - Remake of Korean drama
Hormones (2013) - TV series
In Family We Trust (2018)

References

External links 

Songyos Sugmakanan
Songyos Sugmakanan
Songyos Sugmakanan
Songyos Sugmakanan
1973 births
Living people